This article summarizes the records of Hampshire County Cricket Club by opponent.

First-class
This is a summary of the 2,896 first-class cricket matches played by Hampshire County Cricket Club from 1864 to the end of the 2022 season.

List A
This is a summary of the 1,020 List A cricket matches played by Hampshire County Cricket Club from 1963 to the end of the 2022 Royal London One-Day Cup.

Twenty20
This article is a summary of the 247 Twenty20 cricket matches played by Hampshire County Cricket Club from 2003 to the end of the 2022 season.

References

External links
Hampshire County Cricket Club at CricketArchive

Hampshire County Cricket Club
Lists of English cricket records and statistics